Entrammes is a commune in the Mayenne department in north-western France.

History 
Entrammes owes its location to a major ford across the rivers Mayenne and Jouanne:  the road connecting Le Mans to Rennes traditionally crossed the river here.   Consequently, a substantial town covering approximately 55 hectares existed here already two thousand years ago, and was already settled during the first century BC.

Gallery

See also
 Communes of the Mayenne department
 Roman-Gaul Baths of Entrammes

References

Communes of Mayenne
Diablintes